Église Saint-Étienne de Boofzheim is a church in Boofzheim, Bas-Rhin, Alsace, France. Built in 1516, and then 1608 and 1684, it became a registered Monument historique in 1935.

References

Boofzheim
Boofzheim
Boofzheim
Boofzheim
17th-century Roman Catholic church buildings in France